Carlos Moisés de Lima, commonly known as Carlinhos (born 12 February 1997), is a Brazilian professional footballer who plays as a forward for Audax Rio.

Honours
Corinthians
Campeonato Brasileiro Série A: 2017

References

External links

1997 births
Living people
Brazilian footballers
Association football forwards
Grêmio Novorizontino players
Sport Club Corinthians Paulista players
Oeste Futebol Clube players
Vila Nova Futebol Clube players
Clube Náutico Marcílio Dias players
Sport Club Atibaia players
Associação Desportiva São Caetano players
Esporte Clube Santo André players
Audax Rio de Janeiro Esporte Clube players
Campeonato Brasileiro Série A players
Campeonato Brasileiro Série B players
Campeonato Brasileiro Série D players
People from Jaú